Yemen Gulf of Aden Ports Corporation is a government corporation that governs and manages the Yemeni ports and harbors in Aden. The corporation was established on 21 April 2007.

Port of Aden
Geographically the Port of Aden consists of three areas: the outer harbour which provides anchorage, the oil harbor and the inner harbor.

Usage zones at Aden consist of:

 Ma'alla Multipurpose and Container Terminal
 Aden Container Terminal
 Oil Harbour
 Fishing Harbour

The Aden Refinery Company is located at the oil harbor at Aden port; its operations include transshipment of petroleum products, oil refining and marine fuel station.

See also
 Economy of Yemen
 Government of Yemen
 Gulf of Aden
 Port authority
 Port operator
 Transport in Yemen
 Yemen Arabian Sea Ports Corporation
 Yemen Red Sea Ports Corporation

References

External links
 Port of Aden official site
 Aden Refinery Company

Government of Yemen
Transport in Yemen
Port authorities
Aden
Gulf of Aden
Red Sea
Ports and harbours of Yemen
2007 establishments in Yemen